Woodland Heights is the name of four places in the United States of America:
Woodland Heights, Houston, Texas, an historic neighborhood on Houston's near north side
Woodland Heights, Pennsylvania, a census-designated place in Venango County
Woodland Heights, Richmond, Virginia, a neighborhood on Richmond's Southside